The year 2007 is the 13th year in the history of Fighting Network Rings, a mixed martial arts promotion based in Japan. In 2007 Fighting Network Rings held 2 events beginning with, Rings Holland: The Chosen Ones.

Events list

Rings Holland: The Chosen Ones

Rings Holland: The Chosen Ones was an event held on March 25, 2007 at Vechtsebanen Sport Hall in Utrecht, Netherlands.

Results

Rings Gala: Risky Business

Rings Gala: Risky Business was an event held on September 23, 2007 in The Netherlands.

See also 
 Fighting Network Rings
 List of Fighting Network Rings events

References

Fighting Network Rings events
2007 in mixed martial arts